Čáp is a Czech surname. Notable people with the surname include:

František Čáp (1913–1972), also known as Franz Cap, Czech film director and screenwriter
Tomáš Čáp (born 1978), Czech footballer
Vladimír Čáp (born 1976), Czech footballer
Vladislav Čáp (born 1926), figure skater

Czech-language surnames